The Men's 100 metre butterfly swimming events for the 2020 Summer Paralympics took place at the Tokyo Aquatics Centre from August 25 to September 3, 2021. A total of seven events were contested over this distance.

Schedule

Medal summary
The following is a summary of the medals that were awarded across all 100 metre butterfly events.

Results
The following are the results of the finals only of each of the Men's 100 metre butterfly events in each of the classifications. Further details of each event, including where appropriate heats and semi finals results, are available on that event's dedicated page.

S8

The S8 category is for swimmers who have a single amputation, or restrictive movement in their hip, knee and ankle joints.

The final in this classification took take place on 3 September 2021:

S9

The S9 category is for swimmers who have joint restrictions in one leg, or double below-the-knee amputations.

The final in this classification took place on 2 September 2021:

S10

The S10 category is for swimmers who have minor physical impairments, for example, loss of one hand.

The final in this classification took place on 31 August 2021:

S11

The S11 category is for swimmers who have severe visual impairments and have very low or no light perception, such as blindness, they are required to wear blackened goggles to compete. They use tappers when competing in swimming events.

The final in this classification took place on 3 September 2021:

S12

The S12 category is for swimmers who have moderate visual impairment and have a visual field of less than 5 degrees radius. They are required to wear blackened goggles to compete. They may wish to use a tapper.

The final in this classification took place on 3 September 2021:

S13

The S13 category is for swimmers who have minor visual impairment and have high visual acuity. They are required to wear blackened goggles to compete. They may wish to use a tapper.

The final in this classification took place on 25 August 2021:

S14

The S14 category is for swimmers who have an intellectual impairment.

The final in this classification took place on 25 August 2021:

References

Swimming at the 2020 Summer Paralympics